Hinduism originally came to New Caledonia with Indians who worked as indentured servants of European settlers of the island. There are about 500 New Caledonians of Indian Tamil descent. They were known as Malabar and originally arrived in the 19th century from other French Territories, namely Réunion. 

New Caledonia has several descendants of Tamils, whose parents intermarried with the local population in the 20th century. New Caledonia requires a special study since many Tamils went there as laborers and a report in a book published about 1919 states that of the Chinese, Indians and Javanese who colonized new Caledonia, the Indians gave satisfaction.

See also
Demographics of New Caledonia
Demographics of Oceania
Religion in Oceania
History of the Jews in New Caledonia

References

New Caledonia
Religion in New Caledonia
New Caledonia